Guzmania lehmanniana is a plant species in the genus Guzmania. This species is native to Ecuador and Colombia.

References

lehmanniana
Flora of Ecuador
Flora of Colombia
Plants described in 1889